KWUF-FM (106.1 FM) is a radio station licensed to Pagosa Springs, Colorado, United States.  The station is currently owned by Wolf Creek Broadcasting, LLC.

History
The station was assigned the call letters KRQS on 1984-09-12.  On 1997-05-16, the station changed its call sign to the current KWUF-FM.

On December 13, 2013, KWUF-FM moved from 106.3 FM to 106.1 FM.

References

External links

WUF-FM